The 2009 FIM Ice Speedway World Championship was the 2009 version of FIM Individual Ice Racing World Championship season. The world champion was determined by eight races hosted in four cities.

Classification

See also 
 2009 Team Ice Racing World Championship
 2009 Speedway Grand Prix in classic speedway

References 

Ice speedway competitions
World